Daniel Muñoz-de la Nava and Sergio Pérez-Pérez were the defending champions but decided not to participate.
Nikola Mektić and Antonio Veić won the title, defeating Marin Draganja and Dino Marcan 7–6(7–5), 4–6, [10–3] in the final.

Seeds

Draw

Draw

References
 Main Draw

BRD Arad Challenger - Doubles
2012 Doubles